The flag of the Uzbek SSR was adopted by the Uzbek SSR on 29 August 1952. The red represents the "revolutionary struggle of the working masses", the hammer and sickle represents the peasants' and workers' union, and the red star is the symbol of the communist party. There is no official explanation for the symbolic meanings of other elements. However, in some material the white stripes represent cotton, the blue band represents Amu Darya and irrigation in general.

Before that, from 9 January 1926, the flag was about the same, but with the country's name in Uzbek, Russian and Tajik.

The first flag was hoisted on 22 July 1925 and was red, with the country's name in Arabic and the Cyrillic characters УзССР in the top-left corner in gold. Between 1931 and 1937, the flag was very similar, but with the Uzbek abbreviation OzSSC, and its Russian equivalent: "УзССР."

Between 14 February 1937 and the adoption of the flag in the 1940s, the flag was the same, but with the Uzbek country's name in Latin characters: "OZBEKISTAN SSR." In 1940, the flag was red with the country's name in both Uzbek (Ўзбекистон ССР, Oʻzbekiston SSR) and Russian (Узбекская ССР, Uzbekskaya SSR) languages in gold in the top-left corner.

The last Uzbek SSR was adopted on 29 August 1952. Although the flag is visually identical to the Soviet flag, the red panel has a light blue (azure) down the middle of the whole flag length. At the edges of the light blue stripes are narrow white. The blue stripe with white edges is 1/5 (one-fifth) of the flag width. The specification amendments were accepted on 27 September 1974 and 30 June 1981.

On 31 August 1991, the Uzbek SSR was renamed to the Republic of Uzbekistan and the flag remained in use until 18 November 1991.

History

First version 
On July 22, 1925, the Central Executive Committee (CEC) of the Soviets of the Uzbek SSR adopted Resolution No. 67 "On the Emblem and Flag of the Uzbek Soviet Socialist Republic". The resolution approved the first flag of the Uzbek SSR with the following description :

The 2nd All-Uzbek Congress of Soviets on March 31, 1927 adopted the Constitution  of the Uzbek SSR, which was published on July 11, 1927. The flag is described in chapter 113:

First revision 
In 1927, the 4th session of the CEC of the Soviets of the Uzbek SSR amended Article 113 of the Constitution of the Uzbek SSR. The name of republic was depicted in Uzbek and Tajik language.

Second revision 

On May 9, 1929 the 3rd All-Uzbek Congress of Soviets approved the changes made by the 4th session of the CEC in 1927. The inscription of the name of the republic in Tajik and Uzbek were depicted in Latin alphabet.

Third revision 

On 5 December 1929, the Tajik ASSR was transformed into the Tajik SSR and removed from the Uzbek SSR. In accordance with this, references to the Tajik Autonomous Soviet Socialist Republic were excluded from the Constitution of the Uzbek SSR, including the inscription in the Tajik language in the description of the flag of the Uzbek SSR. 

The new version of the Constitution of the Uzbek SSR was adopted on February 28, 1931 at the 4th All-Uzbek Congress of Soviets in the city of Tashkent. The new version of the flag was described in the Article 103 of the Constitution.

Fourth revision 

From 1934, the spelling of the initial letters in the name of the republic in the Uzbek language and in the translation of the word “socialist” has changed. The change resulted in the initial name of the republic "Өzвekistan Ьҫtьmaьь Şoralar Ҫymhyrijәti (ӨZ.Ь.Ş.Ç)" to "Ozвekistan Sotsialistik Sovet Ҫumhurijәti (OZ.S.S.Ҫ)".

Fifth revision 

From 1935, the translation of the word “republic” into the Uzbek language has changed. This change resulted in the change of the name of the republic : from "Ozвekistan Sotsialistik Sovet Ҫumhurijәti (OZ.S.S.Ҫ)" to "Ozвekistan Sotsialistik Sovet Respublikasi (OZ.S.S.R)"

Second version 
On February 14, 1937, the Extraordinary 6th All-Uzbek Congress of Soviets approved the new Constitution of the Uzbek SSR. The flag was described in Article 144 of the Constitution:

First revision 
On 23 July 1938, the constitution of the Uzbek SSR was amended. The name of the country in Uzbek "Ozʙekistan SSR" was changed into "Ozʙekstan SSR".

Second revision 
On May 8, 1940, the 3rd session of the Supreme Soviet of the Uzbek SSR adopted a law on transition to the alphabet on the basis of Cyrillic alphabet. 

On January 16, 1941, by the Decree of the Presidium of the Supreme Soviet of the Uzbek SSR, the text of the inscription on the state flag of the Uzbek SSR was translated into Russian alphabet.

Third version 

On August 29, 1952, a new flag design, designed by the Uzbek artist Anatoly Kuzmich Osheyko was approved, by the Decree of the Presidium of the Supreme Soviet of the Uzbek SSR.

By the Law of the Uzbek SSR of May 30, 1953, this decree was approved. The flag description in Article 144 of the Constitution of the Uzbek SSR was amended to include the design of the new flag.

On October 31, 1955, the Decree of the Presidium of the Supreme Soviet of the Uzbek SSR "On the Procedure for Raising the State Flag of the Uzbek SSR" was adopted. By the Decree of the PVS of the Uzbek SSR of November 30, 1966, the Decree was amended.

On September 27, 1974, the Decree of the Presidium of the Supreme Soviet of the Uzbek SSR approved the Regulations on the State Flag of the Uzbek SSR, which, in clarifying and supplementing the description of the flag in the Constitution, established:

By the Decree of the Council of Ministers of the Uzbek SSR of October 14, 1974, the instruction on the application of the Regulations on the State Flag of the Uzbek SSR was introduced.

The amendment to the decree "On the State Flag of the Uzbek SSR" was approved by the Decree of the Presidium of the Supreme Soviet of the Uzbek SSR dated June/July 30, 1981. According to the amended decree, the reverse side of the flag was still the same, but without any hammer and sickle.

Symbolism 
There was no official explanation of the symbolism of the flag. In various publications, white stripes represents the cotton-growing fields, and the blue bar represents the Amudarya river and irrigation in Uzbekistan. Another source describes the blue bar as the symbol of Pan-Turkism, as seen in the flag of the Turkic Council, although Uzbekistan was against Pan-Turkism in the USSR.

Fourth version 

A search for a national flag began soon after, with a contest being held to determine the new design. More than 200 submissions were made, and a commission was formed in order to evaluate these suggestions coming from a variety of stakeholders. The winning design was adopted on 18 November 1991, after being selected at an extraordinary session of the Uzbek Supreme Soviet. In doing so, Uzbekistan became the first of the newly independent republics in Central Asia to choose a new flag. Pertaining to its tricolour combination of horizontal stripes of blue, white and green colour, it is similar to the flags of Lesotho, an enclaved country within the border of South Africa, and Puntland, a Somali federal state at the tip of the Horn.

See also 
 Flag of the Soviet Union
 Coat of arms of the Uzbek SSR
 Flag of Uzbekistan

References

Citations

Bibliography

Constitutions

Books 

Uzbek Soviet Socialist Republic
Soviet Socialist Republic
National symbols of Uzbekistan
Uzbek Soviet Socialist Republic